High Wycombe Rugby Football Club is a rugby union club located in High Wycombe, Buckinghamshire. The first XV currently play in Southern Counties North, although the club did play in the national divisions in the first years of league rugby.

League history
When the league system was established in 1987, High Wycombe was placed in South West Division One, then the fifth tier of league rugby. After finishing as runners-up in the first to seasons of league rugby, the club won promotion to Courage Clubs 4 South for the 1991/92 season. The 1993 restructure saw the club placed in Courage League Division 5 South and played in that division throughout its three season existence. However when they were placed back in National 4 South, they were immediately relegated and were relegated again the following season. Since then they have moved between South West 1 East and Southern Counties North, having been promoted and relegated three times.

Club honours
South West Division One champions: 1990-91
Southern Counties North champions (3): 2002–03, 2004–05, 2014–15

References

External links
  Official club website

English rugby union teams
Rugby union in Buckinghamshire
High Wycombe